The Mover ( – 'Father Night') is a 2018 Latvian drama film directed by Dāvis Sīmanis Jr. The film is based on the Latvian novel A Boy and a Dog written by Inese Zandere and illustrated by Reinis Pētersons. It was selected as the Latvian entry for the Best International Feature Film at the 92nd Academy Awards, but was not nominated. In 2019 The Mover was awarded as the best foreign film at Haifa International Film Festival.

Plot
Žanis Lipke, a Latvian dock worker, saves 60 Jews during the German occupation of Latvia during World War II by sheltering them in a bunker under his house and transporting them to safety with the help of his family and friends.

Cast
 Artūrs Skrastiņš as Žanis Lipke
 Ilze Blauberga as Johanna Lipke
 Matīss Kipļuks as Zigis Lipke
 Mihails Karasikovs as Smolansky
 Toms Treinis as Šarja
 Steffen Scheumann as Lēmans
 Imants Erdmans as German Officer
 Madara Paegļkalns as Mina
 Arnis Ozols as Blūms
 Henrijs Arājs as Alfrēds Lipke
 Elza Alberiņa as Aina Lipke

Awards and nominations

See also
 List of submissions to the 92nd Academy Awards for Best International Feature Film
 List of Latvian submissions for the Academy Award for Best International Feature Film

References

External links
 Official website 
 

2018 films
2018 drama films
Latvian drama films
Latvian-language films